Naomi Layzell (born 29 February 2004) is an association footballer who plays as a centre back for Bristol City.

Career

Club 
Layzell made her first team debut in the FA Women's League Cup in a 4–0 win over London Bees on 7 October 2020, and made her first appearance in the FA Women's Super League against Manchester City on 7 November 2020.

International 
Layzell has represented England at U15 ,16, 17, 18 & 19 level.

Career statistics
As of match played 4 April 2021

References

2004 births
Living people
Women's association football defenders
Women's Super League players
English women's footballers
Bristol City W.F.C. players
England women's youth international footballers